My Gift to You may refer to:

 My Gift to You (Hayley Westenra album), 2001
 My Gift to You (Alexander O'Neal album), 1988
 "My Gift to You", a song by Korn from Follow the Leader